Pig's Breakfast (also known as Off The Air) is an Australian children's television series that was broadcast in 1999.

Two alien school kids, Grob and Meeba, accidentally crash their galactic school bus into a television studio on Earth where a producer mistakes them for two actors come to do a skit on her TV show. The aliens are such a hit that she hires them to host the show. Two children, Rodney and Lucy, discover the aliens' identity and help to keep them safe while they try to find a way to get home.

It aired in many countries, including ITV's CITV in the United Kingdom and RTÉ2's The Den in Ireland.

Cast
Nicholas Russell as Rodney Green
Eve Morey as Lucy Green
Heath McIvor as Grob
Jennifer Priest as Meeba
George Kapiniaris as Queegle
Phillip Millar as Queegle
Jeremy Hopkins as Phillip Bailey
Lynda Gibson as Di Bailey
Sally Cooper as Dee
Annie Jones as Sue Green
Francis Greenslade as Martin Green
Peta Brady as Nancy
Gary Files as Mr. Howard
Ernie Gray as Mr. Pratt
Geoff Paine as Malcolm Wilson
Catherine Mack-Hancock as Jessica

Setting
The Television Studio scenes were filmed in and around the Richmond studios of GTV-9 Melbourne.

External links
 

Australian children's television series
Australian science fiction television series
Nine Network original programming
1999 Australian television series debuts
2000 Australian television series endings
Australian television shows featuring puppetry
Television series by Endemol Australia
Television series about extraterrestrial life
Television series about teenagers
Television shows set in Melbourne
ITV children's television shows
Australian children's education television series
Australian preschool education television series